Ljubomir Lovrić (Serbian Cyrillic: Љубомир Ловрић; 28 May 1920 – 26 August 1994) was a Serbian football goalkeeper and later a football manager and journalist.

Career
On the national level he played for Yugoslavia national team (5 matches) and was a participant at the 1948 Olympic Games, where his team won a silver medal. Lovrić later worked as a journalist and football manager, he coached Yugoslavia at the 1962 FIFA World Cup.

References

External links
 Serbian national football team website 

1920 births
1994 deaths
Serbian footballers
Yugoslav footballers
Yugoslavia international footballers
1960 European Nations' Cup managers
1962 FIFA World Cup managers
Footballers at the 1948 Summer Olympics
Olympic footballers of Yugoslavia
Olympic silver medalists for Yugoslavia
SK Jugoslavija players
Red Star Belgrade footballers
Yugoslav First League players
Yugoslav football managers
Serbian football managers
Footballers from Novi Sad
Olympic medalists in football
Medalists at the 1948 Summer Olympics
Association football goalkeepers